To the Devil...a Daughter is a 1976 British-West German horror film directed by Peter Sykes, produced by Hammer Film Productions and Terra Filmkunst, and starring Richard Widmark, Christopher Lee, Honor Blackman, Nastassja Kinski and Denholm Elliott. It is based on the 1953 novel of the same name by Dennis Wheatley. It was the final Hammer production to feature Christopher Lee until The Resident in 2011.

Plot
American expatriate occult writer John Verney (Widmark) is asked by Henry Beddows (Elliot) to pick up his daughter Catherine (Kinski) from London Heathrow Airport. Catherine is a member of the Children of the Lord, a mysterious heretical religious order based in Bavaria that was founded by excommunicated Roman Catholic priest Michael Rayner (Lee). Catherine's deceased mother was part of the order, and had arranged for her daughter to be brought up as a member of the order. Once Catherine arrives in London, Beddows then insists that she stays with Verney for the time being. The order, however, under Rayner, makes all efforts to get Catherine back and uses black magic to stop Verney as he protects her. Verney learns that the order harbours a group of practicing Satanists, who have prepared Catherine to become an avatar of Astaroth upon her eighteenth birthday. Upon learning that Verney has discovered his secret, Rayner kills off Verney's occult writer friends while in the midst of retrieving Catherine from Verney. Using his knowledge of the occult, Verney battles the priest and his henchmen in order to rescue Catherine, who was taken back by Rayner. As Rayner prepares to baptise Catherine in blood, Verney manages to save Catherine by knocking the priest unconscious and carrying her out of the circle of blood created by Rayner.

Cast

Production 
The film was adapted by Christopher Wicking and John Peacock from the 1953 novel of the same name by Dennis Wheatley. It was the second of Wheatley's "black magic" novels to be filmed by Hammer, following The Devil Rides Out, released in 1968. Wheatley disliked the film because it did not follow his novel and he found it obscene. He told Hammer that they were never to make another film from his novels.

Wicking called the film "an awful mess. There was no real focus to it." He wanted to incorporate DNA as part of the storyline but said EMI refused because they felt this would make the film too much like a science fiction movie rather than a horror movie.

Michael Carreras said the film "simply didn't work... the people who made it forgot about the ending." Carerras says he asked Nat Cohen of EMI Films for additional funds to do a new ending– "I had it properly written out and we knew exactly what to do"– but Cohen refused.

This was Michael Goodliffe's last film, made shortly before he  killed himself while suffering from depression.

Lee's line "It is not heresy... and I will not recant!" was sampled by heavy metal band White Zombie for the song "Super-Charger Heaven". The movie's title was also referenced by White Zombie in the song "Black Sunshine" ("To the devil, a daughter comes...")

Kinski was fourteen years old at the time of filming her frontal nude scene.

Critical reception 
, To the Devil...a Daughter holds a 40% approval rating on movie review aggregator website Rotten Tomatoes based on 10 reviews. Variety called the film a "lacklustre occult melodrama" that "seems padded and tentative, and though horrific in spots the actual shock value is remarkably subdued." Linda Gross of the Los Angeles Times found the story "a confusing vacillation between special effects, hallucinations, psychic trances and ongoing narration," but thought the film was "distinguished by engrossing performances," "superior photography" and "eerie music." Gary Arnold of The Washington Post was negative, writing that the film "seems to have been scripted, directed and edited with extreme haste and negligence, as if the filmmakers had to keep one step ahead of process servers or the finance company." Tony Rayns of The Monthly Film Bulletin praised the "expert special effects" and "no-nonsense script," and commented that Christopher Lee played his role "with a gusto absent from his performances for many years." Leonard Maltin's home video guide gave the film 2.5 stars out of 4, saying it was "well made but lacks punch." Time Out called it "a good deal more interesting than the rest of the possession cycle, but still a disappointment."

References

External links 
 

1976 films
1976 horror films
1970s supernatural horror films
British supernatural horror films
Films shot at EMI-Elstree Studios
English-language German films
Films based on horror novels
Films based on works by Dennis Wheatley
Films directed by Peter Sykes
Hammer Film Productions horror films
Films about Satanism
EMI Films films
West German films
Constantin Film films
1970s English-language films
1970s British films